Sir John Blackler Colton,  (23 September 1823 – 6 February 1902) was an Australian politician, Premier of South Australia and philanthropist. His middle name, Blackler, was used only rarely, as on the birth certificate of his first son.

Background and early career
Colton, a son of farmer William Colton (died 10 July 1849) and his wife Elizabeth Colton, née Blackler (died 1888), was born in Devon, England. He arrived in South Australia in December 1839 aboard Duchess of Northumberland with his parents and siblings, who settled at McLaren Vale and started a vineyard.

Colton, however, found work in Adelaide, and at the age of 19 began business for himself as a saddler. He was shrewd, honest and hard-working, and his small shop eventually developed into a large and prosperous wholesale ironmongery and saddlery business, John Colton and Company, which became Harrold, Colton & Company in 1889, then in 1911 Colton, Palmer and Preston Ltd., at the Topham Street corner of Currie Street, which firm survived as hardware merchants well into the latter half of the 20th century.

He gave £100 to start the work on the Pirie Street Wesleyan Church where he was an active member for over 50 years.

Political career
In 1859 Colton was elected a member of the Adelaide City Council, and on 17 November 1862 was returned to the South Australian House of Assembly for Noarlunga, at the head of the poll.

On 3 November 1868 he became commissioner of public works in the Strangways  ministry, but when this cabinet was reconstructed in May 1870 he was omitted. He was Mayor of Adelaide 1874–5, and on 3 June 1875 joined the second Boucaut ministry as Treasurer of South Australia, but he resigned in March 1876. On 6 June he formed his first ministry as premier and commissioner of public works. His ministry lasted until 26 October 1877, when it resigned after a constitutional struggle with the upper house, which had not been consulted about the new parliamentary buildings. The government, however, had succeeded in passing a liberalized crown lands consolidation bill, and a forward policy of public works in connexion with railways and water supply had been carried out.

Colton might have been premier again in June 1881, but stood aside in favour of Bray. On 16 June 1884 he became premier and chief secretary in his second ministry, which in the following twelve months passed some very useful legislation, including a public health act, an agricultural crown land act, a pastoral land act, a vermin destruction act and a land and income tax act. The ministry was defeated on 16 June 1885. Seldom had a ministry done so much in so short a time, but Colton was prostrated by overwork and was compelled to live in retirement for some months. On his return to parliament he attempted to lead the opposition, but an attack of paralysis finished his political career and he resigned from parliament in January 1887.

Later years
Colton paid a visit to England and regained some of his health. Henceforth, he gave much of his time to philanthropic work. It was said of him that no society or charitable institution ever appealed to him in vain for either financial or personal assistance, if they could show that their aims were worthy. He took a great interest in Prince Alfred College, and was its treasurer for many years, and was for a time chairman of the board of management of the Adelaide hospital. He was a great advocate for temperance and retained his interest in the Methodist Church throughout his life.

He was created  on 1 January 1891. He died in Adelaide on 6 February 1902.

Family
On 4 December 1844, Colton married Mary Cutting (December 1822 – 30 July 1898) who, as "Lady Colton", is remembered as a philanthropist and suffragist. Their family included:
John William Colton (20 January 1848 – 26 December 1906), partner with brother Alfred, later managing director of Harrold, Colton & Co.

Alfred Cutting Colton (c.1854 – 29 July 1919) married Eliza Bosisto "Lizzie" Stirling (died 19 March 1947), daughter of George Stirling and niece of Joseph Bosisto CMG (died 8 November 1898), on 10 February 1887, lived at Lorne, Victoria, then retired to Elsternwick, Victoria, where his brother-in-law, Dr. Robert A. Stirling (1855–1928), had a practice.
John Stirling Colton (23 May 1888 – 12 April 1951) married Dorothy Isabel Hawkes in 1914
John Blackler Colton (1 August 1918 – 21 December 1996)
Elizabeth Mary "Bessie" Colton (24 October 1856 – 9 September 1870)
Edwin Blackler Colton (4 May 1859 – 19 August 1916), solicitor of Adelaide, married Emily Gardner Wallace (died 3 January 1922) in 1884
Ellen Hannah Colton (18 October 1863 – 12 February 1946) lived with her father in Hackney
Frank Septimus Colton (25 May 1865 – 22 August 1902) was a medical practitioner in England

References

External links
 

|-

|-

|-

|-

|-

|-

|-

|-

1823 births
1902 deaths
English emigrants to colonial Australia
Mayors and Lord Mayors of Adelaide
Premiers of South Australia
Australian Methodists
Australian Knights Commander of the Order of St Michael and St George
Australian politicians awarded knighthoods
Members of the South Australian House of Assembly
Leaders of the Opposition in South Australia
Treasurers of South Australia
Burials at West Terrace Cemetery
19th-century Australian politicians